Couching is the earliest documented form of cataract surgery.  As a cataract is a clouding in the lens of the eye, couching is a technique whereby the lens is dislodged, thus removing the opacity.  Although couching is nowadays routinely practiced only in remote areas, it was a precursor to modern cataract surgery and pars plana vitrectomy.

History
Cataract surgery by “couching” (lens depression) is one of the oldest surgical procedures. The technique involves using a sharp instrument to push the cloudy lens to the bottom of the eye. Perhaps this procedure is that which is mentioned in the articles of the Code of Hammurabi (ca. 1792–1750 BC) though it is a mere speculation.  Sushruta, an ancient Indian surgeon, described the procedure in “Sushruta Samhita, Uttar Tantra”, an Indian medical treatise (800 BC) (Duke-Elder, 1969; Chan, 2010). From then on the procedure was widespread throughout the world. Evidence shows that couching was widely practiced in China, Europe and Africa. After the 19th century AD, with the development of modern cataract surgery (Intra ocular extraction of lens (1748)), couching fell out of fashion, though it is still used in parts of Asia and Africa.

Modern use
Couching continues to be popular in some developing countries where modern surgery may be difficult to access or where the population may prefer to rely on traditional treatments.  It is commonly practiced in Sub-Saharan Africa.  In Mali it remains more popular than modern cataract surgery, despite the fact that the cost of both methods is similar, but with much poorer outcome with couching.  In Burkina Faso, a majority of patients were unaware of the causes of cataracts and believed it to be due to fate.  It is not performed by ophthalmologists, but rather by local healers or "witch doctors".

Technique
A sharp instrument, such as a thorn or needle, is used to pierce the eye either at the edge of the cornea or the sclera, near the limbus.  The opaque lens is pushed downwards, allowing light to enter the eye.  Once the patients sees shapes or movement, the procedure is stopped.  The patient is left without a lens (aphakic), therefore requiring a powerful positive prescription lens to compensate.

Results
Couching is a largely unsuccessful technique with abysmal outcomes.  A minority of patients may regain low or moderate visual acuity, but over 70% are left clinically blind with worse than 20/400 vision.  A Nigerian study showed other complications include secondary glaucoma, hyphaema, and optic atrophy.  Couching does not compare favourably to modern cataract surgery.

References

Eye surgery